The Kreuzspitze (2,185 m) is the highest mountain in the Bavarian section of the Ammergau Alps and is the 21st highest mountain in Germany.

The mountain is located southeast of the Ammer Saddle. The easiest route to the summit is along the normal path from the north through the Hochgrieß Cirque (Hochgrießkar). A more scenic and varied route, however, is over the Kreuzspitzl to the south and then along the scenic ridge (UIAA climbing grade I to II) to the main peak. The mountain also offers a challenging ski tour through the Hochgrieß Cirque.

The surrounding peaks of Frieder, Geierköpfe and Schellschlicht are also popular tour destinations.

References

Sources 

 Dieter Seibert: AVF Allgäuer Alpen und Ammergauer Alpen, Rother Verlag Munich, 2004, 

Mountains of the Alps
Ammergau Alps
Mountains of Bavaria
Two-thousanders of Germany